The 2012 Italian local elections were held on 6–7 May, with a second round on 20–21 May. In Italy, direct elections were held in 948 municipalities: in each municipality (comune) were chosen mayor and members of the City Council. Of the 948 municipalities, 28 were provincial capitals and only 176 had a population higher than 15,000 inhabitants (10,000 for Sicily).

Citizens living in Italy who were 18 or over on election day were entitled to vote in the local council elections. The deadline for voters to register to vote in the 6–7 May elections was midday on Tuesday 3 April 2012.

For the first time there weren't provincial elections around Italy because they were abolished by the Law n.3660 of 4 December 2011. Instead of a president, the provincial government would be entrusted to a Special Commissioner.

Other elections were taken on 10–11 June with a second round on 24–25 June in 65 municipalities of Sardinia: important cities like Alghero and Oristano chose their mayors and councils.

Total voter turnout on the first round was of 66.9%, lower than that of 2007; 667 municipalities in the first round had a mayor elected (except Sicily).

Voting System
All mayoral elections in Italy in cities with a population higher than 15,000 use the same voting system. Under this system voters express a direct choice for the mayor or an indirect choice voting for the party of the candidate's coalition. If no candidate receives at least 50% of votes, the top two candidates go to a second round after two weeks. This gives a result whereby the winning candidate may be able to claim majority support, although it is not guaranteed.

The election of the City Council is based on a direct choice for the candidate with a preference vote: the candidate with the majority of the preferences is elected. The number of the seats for each party is determined proportionally.

Results
Majority of each coalition in 142 municipalities (comuni) with a population higher than 15,000:

Party results
Party votes in 26 provincial capital municipalities:

Mayoral election results

City councils

External links
Election result archive

2012 elections in Italy
 
 
Municipal elections in Italy
May 2012 events in Italy